Panormus or  Panormos was a small port town of ancient Caria, on the coast south of Miletus.

Its site is located near the modern Kovela Limanı.

References

Populated places in ancient Caria
Former populated places in Turkey